Pavel Kříž (born 18 April 1961 in Brno) is a Czech actor and psychotherapist.

Selected filmography

Film
 Jak svět přichází o básníky (1982)
 Jak básníci přicházejí o iluze (1984)
 The Night of the Emerald Moon (1985)
 Sleeping Dogs (1997)
 Doktor Živago (2002, TV)
 Deník Anne Frankové (2001, TV)
 Vůně vanilky (2001, TV)
 In nomine patris (2004, TV)
 Portraits in Dramatic Time (2011)
 Mission: Impossible – Ghost Protocol (2011) - Marek Stefanski
 How Poets Wait for a Miracle (2016)
 Nabarvené ptáče (2019)
  (2019, TV)

Television
 První krok (2009) - Max Reznícek
 Obchoďák (2009-2010) - Pplk. Ales Bílek
 První republika (2014) - Richard Benoni
 Přístav (2016-2017) - Viktor Drtina
 Krejzovi (2018)

References

External links
 

1961 births
Living people
Czech male film actors
Czech male stage actors
Czech male television actors
20th-century Czech male actors
21st-century Czech male actors
Actors from Brno
Jewish Czech actors
Czech emigrants to Canada
People from Brno in health professions